Exopalystes is a monotypic genus of Papuan huntsman spiders containing the single species, Exopalystes pulchellus. It was first described by Henry Roughton Hogg in 1914, and is found in Papua New Guinea.

See also
 List of Sparassidae species

References

Monotypic Araneomorphae genera
Sparassidae
Spiders of Oceania